German submarine U-194 was a Type IXC/40 U-boat of Nazi Germany's Kriegsmarine built during World War II for service in the Atlantic Ocean. Notable for having been fitted with the new Balkon sonar, she was a short-lived vessel, being sunk on her first and only operational war patrol.

Design
German Type IXC/40 submarines were slightly larger than the original Type IXCs. U-194 had a displacement of  when at the surface and  while submerged. She had two shafts and two  propellers.

U-194 was fitted with six  torpedo tubes (four fitted at the bow and two at the stern), 22 torpedoes, one  SK C/32 naval gun, 180 rounds, and a  SK C/30 as well as a  C/30 anti-aircraft gun. The boat had a complement of forty-eight.

Service history

U-194 was laid down in Bremen on 17 January 1942 and launched on 22 September. Kapitänleutnant Hermann Hesse took command upon commissioning on 8 January 1943.

Balkon group listening apparatus
The passive sonar, known as Gruppenhorchgerät (group listening apparatus) or GHG, fitted to early U-boats could not be used at periscope depth. To solve this, a new listening device, known as Balkon (balcony) fitted to a second, lower hull, was successfully tested on U-194 in January 1943.

Loss
Twelve days into her first and only patrol, U-194 was attacked and sunk by a homing torpedo from an American Consolidated PBY Catalina aircraft of VP-84 in position . All 54 men aboard were lost.

References

Bibliography

External links

German Type IX submarines
U-boats sunk by US aircraft
World War II shipwrecks in the Atlantic Ocean
U-boats commissioned in 1943
1942 ships
U-boats sunk in 1943
World War II submarines of Germany
Ships built in Bremen (state)
Maritime incidents in June 1943